The London Hockey League, also known as the Higgins Group London Hockey League, is a men's field hockey league based in London and the South of England. It was established in 1969.

League Structure 
The men's league has seven divisions (Premier Division to Division six). There is also a Vets league and a Super Vets league, each with two divisions. Each league has a related cup competition.

The London Hockey League was previously a separate entity from the Men's England Hockey League, but from the 2019–20 season  the 2XI teams from the previous season were fed into the South hockey league.

Recent champions
London Hockey League Premier Division

External links
London Hockey League official website

References

Field hockey leagues in England
Field hockey in London
Sports leagues established in 1969
Sports leagues in London
1969 establishments in England